Zaterechny is an urban locality (an urban-type settlement) in Neftekumsky District of Stavropol Krai, Russia. Population:

References

Urban-type settlements in Stavropol Krai